Parkway Center City Middle College is a historic vocational school located in the Callowhill neighborhood of Philadelphia, Pennsylvania. It is part of the School District of Philadelphia. The building was built in 1925–1927 and is a brick building in the Academic Gothic-style. Prior to its current status Parkway Center City Middle College was known as Parkway Center City and was located at 1118 Market Street. The school served as a division of the former Parkway Program, a school without walls program. Also, this building was the former Stoddart-Fleischer Junior High School and later Middle School until it closed in June 2003.

Parkway Center City Middle College is the first high school in Pennsylvania to present intellectuals with the possibility of finishing high school with a high school diploma and an associate degree. Working in partnership with the Community College of Philadelphia, our students are given unparalleled access to dual enrollment classes, with a maximum of 61 college credits available to some scholars throughout their high school careers.

The building was added to the National Register of Historic Places in 1986 as the Helen Fleischer Vocational School.

References

External links

School buildings on the National Register of Historic Places in Philadelphia
Gothic Revival architecture in Pennsylvania
School buildings completed in 1927
High schools in Philadelphia
School District of Philadelphia
1927 establishments in Pennsylvania